Nikos Pappas may refer to:

 Nikos Pappas (basketball) (born 1990), a professional basketball player for Panathinaikos
 Nikos Pappas (politician), current Greek Minister of State

See also
 Nikolaos Pappas (1930–2013), Greek admiral